The Terminals of Los Angeles International Airport have a total of 146 gates in nine passenger terminals arranged in the shape of the letter U or a horseshoe. Passengers can move between terminals via various shuttle buses and inter-terminal pedestrian connections. , the airport is in the midst of a major reconstruction program, at the conclusion of which passengers will be able to make connections between all terminals on foot without having to exit and reenter airport security.

History 
The basic layout of the airport dates back to 1958 when the architecture firm Pereira & Luckman was contracted to plan the re-design of the airport for the "jet age". The plan, developed with architects Welton Becket and Paul Williams, called for a series of terminals and parking structures in the central portion of the property, with these buildings connected at the center by a huge steel-and-glass dome. The dome was never built but the Theme Building built in the central area became a focal point visible to people coming to the airport.

Each terminal originally had a common design: a satellite building out in the middle of the ramp, reached by tunnels from a separate ticketing building. Originally the tunnels were supposed to have moving walkways, but they were eliminated due to funding cuts. Instead, they received mosaics which came to be known as the LAX color tunnels, to make the  walk feel shorter.

Terminals 7 and 8 (built for United Airlines) were the first to be completed on June 25, 1961, followed by Terminals 3 (Trans World Airlines), 4 (American Airlines) and 5 (Western Airlines) in September. Terminal 2 opened as the international terminal in December. Terminal 6, a "consolidated" terminal for other domestic carriers, was the last to open.

A major expansion of the airport came in the early 1980s, ahead of the 1984 Summer Olympic Games. In November 1983 a second-level roadway was added, separating departing and arriving travelers; Terminal 1, which had been planned in the 1958 design, opened in January 1984; and the new Tom Bradley International Terminal opened in June 1984. Throughout the 1980s, the original terminals (2, 3, 4, 5, 6 and 7) were also rebuilt with connector buildings that transformed the separate satellite and ticketing buildings into one continuous terminal.

Inter-terminal connections
Passengers can walk between the Tom Bradley International Terminal (Terminal B) and Terminals 4, 5, 6, 7, and 8 without needing to exit the secure area and be re-screened. A sky bridge walkway connects Terminals B and 4; a tunnel connects Terminals 4, 5 and 6; and a ground-level walkway connects Terminals 6, 7, and 8.

A separate corridor connects Terminals 2 and 3, with connections to Terminal 1 and B under construction . Currently shuttle buses connect Terminals 2 and 3 to Terminal B.

An additional airside shuttle bus operates between Terminals 4 and 5 to the regional terminal.

Terminal 1 
Terminal 1 has 13 gates: Gates 9, 11A–11B, 12A–12B, 13–15, 16, 17A–17B, 18A–18B and the bus gate. , this terminal serves as an operating base for Southwest Airlines (Southwest operates point-to-point routes with bases instead of hubs). The terminal also has check-in facilities for Air Transat, Allegiant Air, Condor, Sun Country Airlines and VivaAerobús. After clearing security in Terminal 1, passengers board a shuttle bus to the West Gates of the Tom Bradley International Terminal where the flights operate.

Terminal 1 was built in 1984 for main tenant Pacific Southwest Airlines (PSA). An extensive renovation, financed by Southwest Airlines, was completed in late 2018 and provided updates to the security screening area, curbside dropoff, terminal areas and baggage handling.

Former tenants of the terminal include Air California, Air Hawaii, AirTran Airways, America West Airlines, Braniff (1983–1990), Morris Air, Pacific Southwest Airlines, Piedmont Airlines (1948–1989), StatesWest Airlines, TranStar Airlines and US Airways.

Terminal 2 

Terminal 2 has 12 gates: Gates 21, 21B, 22, 23A–23B, 24, 25A–25B, 26A–26B, 27 and 28. , this terminal, along with Terminal 3, serves as a hub for Delta Air Lines. The terminal is also used by WestJet. Due to construction, passengers travelling from Terminal 2 check in at Terminal 3.

Terminal 2 was built in 1962, and was the original international terminal. It was completely torn down and rebuilt in stages between 1984 and 1988 at a cost of $94 million. The rebuilt terminal was designed by Leo A Daly. Terminal 2 has CBP (Customs and Border Protection) facilities to process arriving international passengers but arriving Aer Lingus passengers normally use the same arrival facilities as domestic passengers since they have already cleared CBP inspections at their departure airports.

Former tenants of the terminal include Air Canada, Air L.A., Air Mobility Command, Air New Zealand, Air Resorts, Líneas Aéreas Allegro, Asiana, ATA Airlines, Aviacsa, Avianca, Braniff International Airways, Caledonian Airways (1988), Canadian Pacific Air Lines, CAAC Airlines, Capitol Air, Carnival Air Lines, Denver Ports of Call, Hawaiian Airlines, KLM, LTU International, MarkAir, Miami Air International, National Airlines (1934–1980), Northwest Airlines, Omni Air International, Pacific Express, Pan Am, Pan American Airways (1996–1998), People Express Airlines (1980s), Ryan International Airlines, Skyservice Airlines, VASP, Virgin Atlantic, World Airways and the majority of the International carriers before the Tom Bradley International Terminal was completed for the 1984 Summer Olympics.

There are two airline lounges in Terminal 2 with the Delta SkyClub and Virgin Atlantic Clubhouse both being located on the mezzanine level of the concourse. As of Mid-2021, the Virgin Atlantic Clubhouse is no longer operating, and the existing lounge space is used by Delta as an additional SkyClub location at LAX.

Terminal 3 
Terminal 3 has 14 gates: Gates 30A–30B, 31A–31B, 32A–32B, 33, 34A–34B, 35–36, 37A–37B, 38. , this terminal, along with Terminal 2, serves as a hub for Delta Air Lines. The terminal also has check-in facilities for Delta's SkyTeam partner, Aeroméxico; after clearing security in Terminal 3, Aeroméxico passengers board a shuttle to the Tom Bradley International Terminal where the flights operate.

Terminal 3 opened in 1961 and was Trans World Airlines' (TWA's) terminal. Eastern Air Lines initially also shared space as a tenant. The terminal was expanded in 1970 to accommodate widebody operations and between 1980 and 1987, which included a new passenger connector building and baggage system connected to the original satellite. It formerly housed some American Airlines flights after that airline acquired Reno Air and TWA in 1999 and 2001, respectively. Virgin America was also based here from 2008-2017 until the Alaska Airlines merger moved them to Terminal 6. US Airways was housed in Terminal 3 after renovations were started in Terminal 1 from February 2014 until eventually, all American flights were moved to Terminal 4.

Terminal 3 was closed, partially demolished and reconstructed between November 2020 and April 2022 as part of Delta Air Lines' $1.9 billion "Delta Sky Way at LAX" modernization project. The pace of construction was accelerated due to the decline in passenger air travel as the result of the global COVID-19 pandemic.

Former tenants of the terminal include Air California, AirTran Airways, American Airlines, ATA Airlines, Bonanza Air Lines, Braniff International Airways, Eastern Air Lines, Golden West Airlines, The Hawaii Express, Midway Airlines (1976–1991), Midwest Airlines, Northeastern International Airways, Pacific East Airlines, Pacific Express, Reno Air, Southwest Airlines, Spirit Airlines, Trans World Airlines, US Airways, Virgin America, Virgin Australia, and Western Pacific Airlines.

Terminal 3 has one Delta SkyClub.

Terminal 4 

Terminal 4 has 16 gates: Gates 40–41, 42A–42B, 43–45, 46A–46C, 47A–47B, 48A–48B, and 49A–49B. , this terminal, the Regional Terminal, and part of Terminal 5, serve as a hub for American Airlines.

Terminal 4 was built in 1961, was expanded in 1983 by adding a connector from the ticketing areas to the original satellite, and was renovated in 2002 at a cost of $400 million in order to improve the appearance and functionality of the facility. The renovation was designed by Rivers & Christian. Some international departures operate at TBIT.

American Airlines and American Eagle have more gates than any other airline at LAX, with 28 (American Airlines operates from 32 gates in total, including 9 gates at the American Eagle satellite terminal, 4 dedicated gates at Terminal 5, as well as 4 rotating gates at Tom Bradley International Terminal).

American Airlines has one Admirals Club in the terminal.

Former tenants of the terminal include: Air California, Alaska Airlines, America West Airlines, KLM, Midwest Airlines, Northwest Airlines, Piedmont Airlines (1948–1989), Pride Air, Reno Air, Sun Aire Lines and Wings West Airlines.

Terminal 5 
Terminal 5 has 15 gates: Gates 50A–50B, 51A–51B, (Gates 52A–52I are located at the American Eagle Terminal), 53A–53B, 54A–54B, 55A, 56–57, 58, and 59. , the terminal serves as an operating base for JetBlue (JetBlue operates point-to-point routes with bases instead of hubs) and along with Terminal 4, serves as a hub for American Airlines. The terminal is also used by Hainan Airlines and Spirit Airlines.

Terminal 5 opened in 1962, and Western Airlines occupied this terminal until Western was merged with Delta on April 1, 1987. Terminal 5 was redesigned by Gensler, expanded to include a connector building between the original satellite and the ticketing facilities and remodeled from 1986 through early 1988. It was unofficially named 'Delta's Oasis at LAX' with the slogan 'Take Five at LAX' when construction was completed in the summer of 1988. Northwest Airlines moved all operations to Terminal 5 and Terminal 6 alongside Delta on June 30, 2009, as part of its merger with the airline.

Delta, which had been based for decades in Terminal 5 (with additional gates in Terminal 6), moved to Terminals 2 and 3 between May 12–17, 2017 in order to relieve overcrowding and provide better and easier transfers with its airline partners at Tom Bradley International Terminal.

American Eagle flights operate from a satellite terminal that is located just east of Terminal 8. This terminal has 9 gates that supplement American's mainline operation at Terminals 4 and 5.

In July 2020, JetBlue announced that they would close their Long Beach operating base due to their routes underperforming there and because the officials at Long Beach refused to build a customs facility at LGB. As a result, JetBlue announced they would create a new operating base at LAX, as they planned a big expansion at the airport. JetBlue opened their LAX operating base on October 7, 2020, at Terminal 5. Because they moved their base to Los Angeles, they were able to expand domestically and internationally on the West Coast.

Former tenants of the terminal include Aeromexico, Air Jamaica, Air Tahiti Nui, Allegiant, British Caledonian, China Southern Airlines, Delta Air Lines, Ecuatoriana de Aviación, Frontier, Hawaiian Airlines, Mexicana de Aviación, Northwest Airlines, SkyWest Airlines, Song (airline), Sun Country, Swissair, TriStar Airlines and Western Airlines. As of May 1, 2021, Sun Country and Allegiant moved their operations to the West Gates at Terminal B.

American Airlines has one Admirals Club in the terminal, occupying the space of the former Delta SkyClub.

Terminal 6 
Terminal 6 has 14 gates: Gates 60–63, 64A–64B, 65A–65B, 66, 67, 68A–68B, and 69A–69B. , the terminal serves as a hub for Alaska Airlines and is also used by Air Canada and small regional airlines Advanced Air and Southern Airways Express.

The terminal opened as "Satellite 6" and "Ticketing Building 6" in November 1963 and marked the conclusion of the initial phase of passenger terminal construction at the airport. When it originally opened, it was a common use, multi-carrier terminal that supported the operations of Continental Airlines, Delta Air Lines, Pacific Air Lines and Pacific Southwest Airlines. The original building was capable of handling six planes at one time.

In the early 1970s, Continental and Delta built the "Satellite Extension" to expand Satellite 6, adding additional gates to the south end of the building and reconfiguring the existing structure to accommodate the new "jumbo jet", the Boeing 747. When the project was complete, Satellite 6 was able to simultaneously handle eight planes: two 747s, four wide-bodied tri-jets, and two smaller planes such as the Boeing 707 or 727. Four of these gates have two jetways, which can accommodate large aircraft.

In 1982, Continental sponsored the Connector project which joined the Ticketing Building to the Satellite and the Satellite Extension, adding additional gates and facilities.

Prior to October 2014, United Airlines used the connector gates, supplementing its base at Terminal 7. Delta also leased some space from the Airport in Terminal 6, in addition to its base at Terminal 5. Most of the rotunda gates can feed arriving passengers into a sterile corridor that shunts them to Terminal 7's customs and immigration facility.  On November 6, 2014, American Airlines moved US Airways flights from Terminal 3 into Terminal 6, taking 4 gates in the Connector Building. On January 31, 2017, American Airlines relocated these 4 gates to Terminal 5 as part of the larger LAX Terminal relocation program.

In April 2011, Alaska Airlines agreed to a deal with Los Angeles World Airports to renovate Terminal 6 and build an Alaska Lounge for first class passengers. The airline moved its flights to Terminal 6 on March 20, 2012, and Spirit Airlines was relocated to Terminal 3.

In July 2021, construction began on another round of refurbishments to the terminal. On the customer-facing front, the gate areas, departure lounges, Border Protection, and TSA Security areas are being refurbished/upgraded and new jet bridges will be installed. Additionally, a drive through bus gate will be added to ease transfers to other terminals. On the operations front, the apron paving, fuel lines and other airfield infrastructure will be upgraded. As construction progresses, different areas of the terminal will be closed to passengers, starting with the three gates at the southeast end. Construction is scheduled to conclude in 2023.

Former tenants of the terminal include American Airlines, Continental Airlines, Copa Airlines, Delta Air Lines, Eastern Air Lines, Frontier Airlines (1950–1986), Great Lakes Airlines, Hughes Airwest, Lufthansa, National Airlines (1999–2002), Pacific Air Lines, Pacific Southwest Airlines, Republic Airlines, SkyWest Airlines, Swift Aire Lines, Ted (airline), United Airlines, Wardair, Virgin America, VivaAerobus and US Airways.

Terminal 7

Terminal 7 has 13 gates: Gates 70A–70B, 71A–71B, 72A–72B, 73, 74, 75A–75B, 76A–76B, and 77. , this terminal, along with Terminal 8, serves as a hub for United Airlines.

The terminal opened in 1962 and was expanded to accommodate widebody aircraft in 1970. The terminal was expanded in 1982 with the addition of a connector building, which today consists of gates 70A-70B and 71A-71B. Four of these gates have two jetways, which accommodate large aircraft. The interior of the terminal was renovated between January 1998 and June 1999 at a cost of $250 million, was designed by HNTB, and was constructed by Hensel Phelps Construction. Added were new gate podiums, increased size of gate areas, relocated concessions, expanded restrooms, new flooring, and new signage. Also, the roof of the terminal was raised, and new, brighter light fixtures were added in order to provide more overall lighting. In 2017, Terminal 7 underwent another renovation, with significant changes to concessions. The terminal also contains a United Club and a United Polaris Lounge. The terminal has a customs area located on the arrivals floor, used by international United flights and Alaska Airlines flights in adjacent Terminal 6.

Former tenants of the terminal include: Aspen Airways, Braniff (1983–1990), Imperial Airlines, Independence Air, Leisure Air, Los Angeles Airways, Texas International Airlines, Shuttle by United, Ted (airline) and Virgin Atlantic.

Terminal 8

Terminal 8 was originally called Concourse 8 because it does not have its own passenger processing facilities (ticketing, security checkpoint or baggage claim) and relies on the facilities located in Terminal 7. The building was redeveloped in 1982, ahead of the 1984 Olympics.

Tom Bradley International Terminal (Terminal B)

The Tom Bradley International Terminal (TBIT), also referred as Terminal B, has 40 gates: Gates 130–225. The terminal hosts 29 airlines, mostly those based outside of the United States.

The massive terminal is separated into several different areas: North Concourse (9 gates: 130–135, 137, 139, 141); Bus Gates (6 gates: 136, 138, 140, 142, 144, 146); South Concourse (10 gates: 148, 150–157, 159); West Gates (15 gates: 201A, 201B, 202–208, 209A, 209B, 210A, 210B, 221, 225); and the Bus Port. The Bus Gates and the Bus Port are used to shuttle passengers from the remote check-in area at Terminal 1, between Terminals B and 2, and between Terminal B and nine satellite gates located remotely on the west side of the LAX airfield.

History 
The Tom Bradley International Terminal opened on June 18, 1984, just weeks before the start of the 1984 Summer Olympic Games. 

The building was added to the west end of the passenger terminal area between Terminals 3 and 4. Prior to this, Terminal 2 was the primary international terminal. It is named for Tom Bradley, the first African-American and longest-serving (20 years) mayor of Los Angeles, and a champion of LAX.

By the early 2000s, airport managers grew concerned about LAX's future as an international gateway. The international terminal was aging, and many carriers had reduced flights to LAX in favor of more modern airports, such as San Francisco and Seattle/Tacoma. By 2007, LAX lost 12% of the seats on its weekly international departures. At the same time, the airport was concerned that it would not be able to accommodate future larger commercial aircraft, the Airbus A380 and Boeing 747-8.

Airport management gave the old terminal a minor facelift in September 2006, adding new paging, air conditioning and electrical systems, along with new elevators, escalators and baggage carousels. Meanwhile, the southern-most runway, 7R/25L was shifted  to the south to prepare it for the additional width of the Airbus A380 and add a parallel taxiway between the adjacent runway. Runway 7R/25L reopened on March 25, 2007, and the taxiway was completed in 2008.

On March 19, 2007, the Airbus A380 made its US debut with simultaneous landings at LAX and John F. Kennedy International Airport in New York City. Commercial service with the Airbus A380 started on October 20, 2008, with Qantas service between LAX and Sydney. Because the Bradley Terminal was too small to accommodate the jet, the plane was serviced using the satellite gates located on the west side of the LAX airfield.

The Bradley Terminal was heavily modernized and expanded in phases between 2008 and 2021.

The design by Fentress Architects in association with HNTB was unveiled on November 17, 2008. The first phase of construction began on February 22, 2010, and included the demolition and replacement of the north concourse gates and the construction of the "Great Hall" with dining, retail shopping and large airline alliance lounges. Work on the first phase was completed in 2013 and crews began the second phase, which included the replacement of the south concourse and the expansion of the security, customs and immigration processing areas. The second phase was completed in 2015. Of the 19 gates in the modernized terminal, 9 are equipped with three jetbridges to accommodate the largest commercial aircraft, the Airbus A380 and Boeing 747-8.

The third phase would be a new mid-field concourse and construction began on February 27, 2017. The concourse, later renamed the West Gates at Tom Bradley International opened on May 1, 2021. Two of the gates in the West Gates concourse can accommodate the A380.

Regional Terminal 
The Regional Terminal has nine gates: Gates 52A–52I, although Gate 52B is a bus gate. The terminal is used exclusively for American Eagle flights, earning it the nickname “the Eagle’s nest.”  It serves as the remainder of American's hub operations in Los Angeles, supplementing Terminal 4 and 5.

The terminal is located on the southeast side of the LAX airfield, east of Sepulveda Boulevard from Terminal 8. As it is physically separated from the other terminal buildings, passengers access the Regional Terminal using a system of shuttle buses. Buses operate between the Regional Terminal and Terminal 4 or Terminal 5, which house American Airlines' other gates.

The Regional Terminal's gate numbers (52A–52I) are meant to encourage passengers originating their travel from LAX to enter the airport through the less congested Terminal 5 and board the bus at a stop located at Gate 52. But as the majority of American Airlines' mainline fights at LAX operate out of Terminal 4, a separate bus service is additionally operated to that terminal to minimize connection times.

The terminal has a covered walkway and ramp at each gate for access and egress to the aircraft instead of jet bridges.The terminal features restrooms, seating areas with power outlets, and a concession area.

American Airlines has one Admirals Club in the terminal,

The terminal originally handled United Express flights (gates 71C-71K) until it was vacated in 2005.  American Eagle flights were relocated to the terminal in January 2010 from a remote terminal which was 0.3 mi (500 m) west of Terminal 4 that would later be demolished.

LAX Automated People Mover

Headways are expected to be as low as two minutes between trains. Construction started in 2017, and was anticipated to be completed by 2023.

The three westernmost stations will be located in the Central Terminal Area (CTA) located near the parking structures, and connect to their respective terminals via pedestrian bridges:
 West CTA station, serving terminals 3, 4, and B (the Tom Bradley International Terminal)
 Center CTA station, serving terminals 2, 5, and 6
 East CTA station, serving terminals 1, 7, and 8

The LAX Automated People Mover will connect the CTA to transportation options:
 LAX West Intermodal Transportation Facility, an economy parking structure with access to the LAX City Bus Center and nearby hotels
 LAX/Metro Transit Center station (also known as the ITF East), connecting to the Los Angeles Metro Rail system, scheduled to open in 2024
 LAX Consolidated Rent-A-Car Facility, which will house 21,000 rental vehicles for all of the major rental car companies that operate at LAX

References 

Los Angeles International Airport
Los Angeles International Airport, Terminals of